In mathematics, the small boundary property is a property of certain topological dynamical systems. It is dynamical analog of the inductive definition of Lebesgue covering dimension zero.

Definition 

Consider the category of topological dynamical system (system in short) consisting of a compact metric space  and a homeomorphism . A set  is called small if it has vanishing orbit capacity, i.e., .

The system  is said to have the small boundary property (SBP) if  has a basis of open sets  whose boundaries are small, i.e.,  for all .

Can one always lower topological entropy?  

Small sets were introduced by Michael Shub and Benjamin Weiss while investigating the question "can one always lower topological entropy?" Quoting from their article:

"For measure theoretic entropy, it is well known and quite easy to see that a positive entropy transformation always has factors of smaller entropy. Indeed the factor generated by a two-set partition with one of the sets having very small measure will always have small entropy. It is our purpose here to treat the analogous question for topological entropy... We will exclude the trivial factor, where it reduces to one point."

Recall that a system  is called minimal if it has no proper non-empty closed -invariant subsets. It is called infinite if .

Lindenstrauss introduced SBP and proved:

Theorem: Let  be an extension of an infinite minimal system. The following are equivalent:

  has the small-boundary property.
 , where  denotes mean dimension.
  where  is an inverse limit of systems with finite topological entropy  for all .

Later this theorem was generalized to the context of several commuting transformations by Gutman, Lindenstrauss and Tsukamoto.

Systems with no non-trivial finite entropy factors

Let  and  be the shift homeomorphism

This is the Baker's map, formulated as a two-sided shift. It can be shown that  has no non-trivial finite entropy factors. One can also find minimal systems with the same property.

References 

Topological dynamics